Raphael Maltinsky (born 18 December 1987) is a Brazilian-Israeli professional association football player currently without a club.

Biography

Arrival to Israel
Maltinsky arrived in Israel for the second time in order to sign with Hapoel Petah Tikva while also holding an offer from Brazilian club Vitória. Originally, he was wanted by Maccabi Netanya but no deal could be brokered and he returned to his native Brazil.

During a training session on 6 October 2009, Maltinsky got into a heated war of words with Kobi Dajani. After some physical play, Dajani walked over to Maltinsky and headbutted him in the face requiring Maltinsky to be taken to a hospital where he had four stitches put in. Dajani apologized the following day to Maltinsky but both were not allowed back in to train with the club without going before a tribunal.

Statistics

Footnotes

External links 
 

1987 births
Living people
Brazilian Jews
Jewish footballers
Brazilian footballers
Brazilian emigrants to Israel
Israeli Jews
Israeli people of Brazilian-Jewish descent
Israeli footballers
Liga Leumit players
Israeli Premier League players
Hapoel Petah Tikva F.C. players
Maccabi Ironi Amishav Petah Tikva F.C. players
Hapoel Mahane Yehuda F.C. players
Maccabi Ironi Kfar Yona F.C. players
Association football midfielders